Stan Mack (b. May 13, 1936) is an American cartoonist best known for his series, Stan Mack's Real Life Funnies, which ran in The Village Voice for over 20 years. His Adweek comic strip, Stan Mack’s Outtakes, covered the New York media scene. An early comic strip was Mule's Diner, which ran in the National Lampoon.

Mack was born in Brooklyn but grew up in Providence, Rhode Island, and is a graduate of the Rhode Island School of Design.  He served in the United States Army, stationed at the United States Military Academy at West Point, in the Department of Social Sciences.

Before turning to cartooning, Mack was the art director for Book Week at the New York Herald Tribune, and art director of the Book and Education Department and The New York Times Sunday Magazine at The New York Times.

Real Life Funnies was notable for its semi-documentary feel: all dialog was culled from Mack's observations, and reported as "100% Guaranteed Overheard". He said of it: "This job gave me an excuse to accost people, to be pushy and aggressive. ... I learned to take notes on my shirt cuffs and walk backward in crowds. But most of all I learned to listen to what ordinary people have to say."

With his late partner Janet Bode, he cowrote several young adult nonfiction books, including Heartbreak and Roses, Hard Time, and For Better, For Worse. He has also created children's picture books, including Where's My Cheese and 10 Bears in My Bed. In 1998, Mack wrote and illustrated The Story of the Jews: A 4,000 Year Adventure, a humorous cartoon look at the history of the Jews. In his 2004 book Janet & Me: An Illustrated Story of Love and Loss, he wrote about his eighteen-year relationship with Bode and her eventual death from cancer.

Mack's latest book, with Susan Champlin, is The Road to Revolution (2009), the first of a series of historical graphic novels for young people.

References

Sources 
 National Association of Art Directors, Art Direction (Advertising Trade Publications, 1967).

External links 
 
 
 
 
 , a TV special of the same name.
 

Living people
1936 births
The Village Voice people

Rhode Island School of Design alumni